Bishop Christophoros (Rakintzakis), born George Rakintzakis (May 1, 1931, Athens, Greece – February 14, 2020, Greece), H.B.A., B.Div., B.Ed., M.A., was the first Vicar-Bishop of the Greek Orthodox Metropolis of Toronto (Canada) under the Ecumenical Patriarchate of Constantinople (1999–2017), and the titular Bishop of Andida (1999–2020). He also served as the first Dean of the Toronto Orthodox Theological Academy from October 1997 through to June 2006. In addition, he was a brother of the historic Hosios Loukas  monastery in Boeotia, Greece. He officially retired in 2017 and resided in Greece for the remainder of his life.

Life

Bishop Christophoros of Andida  was born George Rakintzakis on 1 May 1931, in Athens, Greece.

Education and Training

He studied at the Theological School of the University of Athens from 1948 to 1953.

After attending the Teaching School of Secondary Education from 1966 to 1968, he pursued further studies at the School of Philosophy of the University of Athens, from 1968 to 1971.

Being a recipient of the Greek State Scholarship award, he completed his post-graduate studies in Great Britain. First he specialized in pedagogy at the UCL Institute of Education in London from 1971 to 1972. Later he earned his Master of Arts in Byzantine History at the University of Birmingham from 1973 to 1975.

In Greece he had also previously completed his military service over a two-year term as a reserve artillery officer in the Hellenic Army.

Public Education Instructor

He served as a High School and Lyceum headmaster from 1959 to 1990. From 1975 he was Professor at the Athonite Ecclesiastical Academy on Mount Athos, teaching there periodically over the next eight years.

From 1990 to 1991 he was the Superintendent of Secondary Education in the Province of Vyoteia (Boeotia Prefecture).

Subsequently, he served in the Office of Educational Affairs, at the Consulate General of Greece in Toronto, from 1991 to 1993.

Ordination and Ministry

He was ordained to the deaconate on July 11, 1986, and to the priesthood on July 12, 1986 by Metropolitan Ieronymos of Thebes and Livadia. On July 13, 1986 he was advanced to the rank of Archimandrite at the Holy Metropolis of Thebes and Livadeia.

Thereafter he worked periodically as a missionary, first in South Korea in 1989, then in Hong Kong in 1992 and again from 1994–1995.

In Toronto, Christophoros served as the parish priest at the historic Saint George's Greek Orthodox Church in downtown Toronto from 1997 to 1999. Concurrently, he became the first Dean of the Toronto Orthodox Theological Academy, from October 1997 through to June 2006. As such, he was instrumental in cultivating the first cohorts of students who graduated from the Academy, were ordained as priests, and proceeded to serve Greek Orthodox communities across Canada.

In 1999 he was named as titular Bishop of Andida, which was a former Diocese of the Metropolis of Pergis in Asia Minor. He was elected Auxiliary Bishop of the Greek Orthodox Metropolis of Toronto (Canada) on June 10, 1999 and was ordained as Bishop on June 26, 1999. The consecration took place at the Church of St. Nicholas in Scarborough, with five consecrating hierarchs participating including:

 Metropolitan Archbishop Sotirios (Athanassoulas), who presided at the consecration;
 Metropolitan Anthony (Gergiannakis) of Dardanellion and San Francisco; 
 Metropolitan Maximos (Aghiorgoussis) of Ainos and Pittsburgh; 
 Bishop Yurij (Kalistchuk) of the Ukrainian Orthodox Church of Canada; and
 Bishop Vasileios (Karayannis) of Trimythountos from the Church of Cyprus.

Christophoros  attended the Extraordinary Sobor of the Ukrainian Orthodox Church of Canada held from August 22–24, 2008 in Saskatoon, representing Patriarch Bartholomew I.

Bishop Christophoros also took part at the inaugural meeting of the Episcopal Assembly of North and Central America from May 26–28, 2010, representing the Greek Orthodox Metropolis of Toronto (Canada).

Death

Bishop Christophoros died on February 14, 2020, aged 89, in Greece. His body lay in state at the Metropolitan Cathedral of the Entrance of the Theotokos in Livadeia on Saturday February 15 for the duration of the Divine Liturgy, his funeral service taking place directly afterwards. He was interred at the Hosios Loukas  monastery in Boeotia, Greece, where he was a brother.

Archbishop Sotirios (Athanassoulas) of Canada learned of the death of Bishop Christophoros while he was present at the Ecumenical Patriarchate as a member of the Holy Synod. He spoke with Ecumenical Patriarch Bartholomew at the meeting of the Holy Synod about the life of Bishop Christopher, calling him a "Man of God" and emphasizing his contribution as a priest and bishop in Canada. He was said to have been a man of deep faith, with trusting and abiding love in Christ, the Theotokos and the Eastern Orthodox Church, and who particularly loved and spoke often about the lives and teachings of the saints. His humility and Christian example was said to have brought many people, particularly the youth, to the Church, and he served as a father confessor to many clergy and laity.

Notes

References

Sources

 Christophoros Rakintzakis. Orthodoxia: Institute for Ecumenical Studies, Université de Fribourg, Switzerland. 
 Bishop Christophoros (Rakintzakis). Canadian Orthodox Christian History Project.
  His Grace Bishop Christoforos. Greek Orthodox Metropolis of Toronto (Canada). 
  Ἀνδίδων κ. Χριστοφόρος. The Ecumenical Patriarchate of Constantinople.

1931 births
2020 deaths
20th-century Eastern Orthodox bishops
21st-century Eastern Orthodox bishops
Archimandrites
Bishops of the Ecumenical Patriarchate of Constantinople
Eastern Orthodox bishops in Canada
Canadian university and college faculty deans
Eastern Orthodox missionaries
Greek Christian missionaries
Eastern Orthodox missionaries in South Korea
Christian missionaries in Hong Kong
National and Kapodistrian University of Athens alumni
Alumni of the UCL Institute of Education
Alumni of the University of Birmingham
Clergy from Athens